The phrase "elective dictatorship" (also called executive dominance in political science) describes the state in which a typical Westminster system state's parliament is dominated by the government of the day. It refers to the fact that the legislative programme of Parliament is determined by the government, and government bills virtually always pass the legislature because of the nature of the majoritarian first-past-the-post electoral system, which almost always produces strong government, in combination with the imposition of party discipline on the governing party's majority, which almost always ensures loyalty.

The phrase was popularised by the former Lord Chancellor of the United Kingdom, Lord Hailsham, in a Richard Dimbleby Lecture at the BBC in 1976. The phrase is found a century earlier, in describing Giuseppe Garibaldi's doctrines, and was used by Hailsham (then known as Quintin Hogg) in lectures in 1968 and 1969.

Constitutional background
In the United Kingdom, ultimate legislative sovereignty resides in Parliament (Parliamentary sovereignty).  Parliament may pass any legislation on any subject it wishes.  Parliament operates without restraints such as, for instance, an obligation to legislate in accordance with fundamental constitutional rights.  The apparent exceptions to this rule are situations in which Parliament has chosen to limit itself as with the case of implementation of European Union law, where British courts can "disapply" UK legislation that is in conflict with EU law (see Factortame), but could withdraw such authority, as it has by and large done since leaving the European Union.

Parliament consists of the House of Lords, the House of Commons and the Monarch.  The customary common law rule is that in order for a bill to become an act of Parliament, it is necessary for it to be passed in both the Commons and the Lords. The bill will then go before the Monarch who has formal discretion whether to assent to the bill.  On receiving Royal Assent, it will become an Act of Parliament and will be applied by the courts.

Such is the theory; in practice Royal Assent has become a formality, the monarch has not refused (or threatened to refuse) assent to a bill for some 300 years (Queen Anne in 1708).  Further, since 1911, the House of Lords has lost its position of equality with the Commons.  The Parliament Acts of 1911 and 1949 reduced the power of the Lords from an absolute veto to a suspensive veto.  Once the same bill has been passed by the Commons and rejected by the Lords in two different sessions of Parliament, a third introduction of the bill will require only the consent of the Commons.  Such a bill will then go for Royal Assent and will become law, irrespective of the view of the Lords.  The Commons have, therefore, become the dominant component of Parliament - whoever controls the Commons controls Parliament, the primary legislative body of the land.

Operation
The party which commands a majority in the House of Commons forms the government.  The governing party should consequently be able to pass any bill they wish through the Commons, provided that voting discipline is enforced amongst their Members of Parliament (MPs).  This is accomplished largely through the whip system.  The dominance of Parliament's legislative programme by the majority party is such that 95 per cent of bills are initiated by the government.  Rebellions, though not unknown, are rare.

The government, so long as they can keep their MPs on-side, stand an excellent chance of getting their legislation through the Commons.  The Lords may or may not also approve the legislation, however a combination of judicious compromise from the government, combined with the Salisbury Convention and the overarching threat of the Parliament Act means that most legislation also manages to get through the Lords.  Royal Assent then invariably follows.

Hailsham borrowed the expression "elective dictatorship" to describe this situation in which control of the Commons (and thus of Parliament) by the government is actually weak. His paper was published as a criticism of the Labour government of Harold Wilson and James Callaghan. He saw these governments as undemocratic, as despite their slim hold on the Commons they were able to pass a large number of their bills. He saw this as undemocratic as they did not reflect, as Hailsham saw it, wide enough support in the country. Many have interpreted Hailsham's criticism as being one against large majorities. In fact, he actually saw these as more democratic, as they had commanded more support at elections.

Proposals for reform
A common proposal from reformers to reduce this executive dominance is to reduce the power of the majority party by adopting an electoral system based on proportional representation for the Commons.  The Green Party of England and Wales, Liberal Democrats, and Scottish National Party have consistently supported PR for the Commons, although without noticeable support from larger parties.

Some groups, such as Charter 88, have argued that a codified, written constitution with appropriate checks and balances is also essential to solving the problem of executive dominance, although again without popular success.

The Power Inquiry in its 2006 report Power to the People made recommendations on how to deal with the democratic deficit inherent in the UK system of governance.

See also
Democratic centralism
Democratic deficit
Elective monarchy

References

Westminster system
Legislatures
Dictatorship
Political science terminology
Politics of the United Kingdom
Political systems